Pontefract Monkhill railway station is the busiest station in the town of Pontefract, West Yorkshire, England.

The other stations in the town are Pontefract Tanshelf and Pontefract Baghill.

History

The lines to Leeds via Castleford and Wakefield Kirkgate separate immediately west of the station, which was opened by the Wakefield, Pontefract & Goole Railway (one of the constituent companies of the Lancashire and Yorkshire Railway) in April 1848. The branch to Castleford (Cutsyke) & Methley Junction was completed the following year (on 1 December) and a pair of short curves were subsequently constructed from the eastern end to link up with the Swinton & Knottingley Joint line following its opening in the spring of 1879.  One of these was used by passenger trains between Leeds & Pontefract Baghill until 1964, although it has since been lifted.  The Wakefield to Goole passenger service was withdrawn on 2 January 1967 (although trains to and from Goole continued, running instead to Castleford & Leeds) but the line remained open to carry coal to the power stations to the east of Knottingley.  Services on the Wakefield to Knottingley route were reinstated in May 1992.

Facilities
The station is unstaffed and no longer has permanent buildings other than standard waiting shelters.  There is an automated ticket machine on the Leeds bound platform.  There are digital information screens and timetable posters on both platforms, along with a customer help point on platform 1.  Step-free access is only available from the car park to platform 1, as platform 2 (towards Knottingley and Goole) can only be reached via the footbridge (which has stairs).

Services
From Mondays to Saturdays, there is a roughly half-hourly service operated by Northern between Leeds and Knottingley.

Three trains via Castleford are extended to or from : one service from Goole to Leeds in the morning (which is formed from an empty train that runs towards Goole earlier) and one return trip from Leeds to Goole in the evening.

On Sundays the service is hourly, with trains also running alternately via Castleford and Wakefield to Leeds, and no services operate past Knottingley to Goole.

London
In January 2009, open access operator Grand Central was given the go ahead by the Office of Rail Regulation (ORR) to operate a service between Bradford Interchange and London King's Cross which call here (giving the station a regular service to the capital for the first time).  Three daily paths in each direction are allocated for these new trains, although one morning northbound service uses a different route between Doncaster and Wakefield and consequently does not call here.

The service is operated and branded by Grand Central, using refurbished Class 180 units, and started on 23 May 2010.  However, according to a recent document submitted the ORR, only 15 passengers a day (on average) are making use of the new service.

As of 2023, there are three southbound services and two northbound services per day on weekdays. On Saturdays this is increased to four southbound services but reduced to one northbound service. There is no Grand Central service on Sundays.

Notes

References

Body, G. (1988), PSL Field Guides - Railways of the Eastern Region Volume 2, Patrick Stephens Ltd, Wellingborough,

External links

Railway stations in Wakefield
DfT Category F1 stations
Former Lancashire and Yorkshire Railway stations
Northern franchise railway stations
Pontefract
Railway stations in Great Britain opened in 1848
Railway stations served by Grand Central Railway